Cousteau are a London-based band who enjoyed considerable international success, particularly in Italy and the U.S. from 1999 to 2005. The band's sound has been compared to Burt Bacharach, Scott Walker and David Bowie with an updated contemporary edge.

Their best known song remains the single "The Last Good Day of the Year", from their eponymous debut album. It has featured in advertisements (such as those for Nissan in the United States and Borsci in Italy), films (such as Happily Ever After, with Charlotte Gainsbourg, winner of the Special Selection category at the Toronto Film Festival 2005, and South Kensington with Rupert Everett) and documentaries and television programmes around the world. It also enjoyed radio play on both BBC Radio 1 and BBC Radio 2 in the UK, later becoming a staple of the NPR and AAA networks in the US.

History
The first release of the 1999 eponymous album was 'home-made' and included many demos produced for various major labels. 3,000 copies of the album were pressed by indie label Global Warming (later to become Series 8) set up by Trevor Holden. The album sold out after receiving good reviews, including a 5-star review in Uncut magazine, and recommended album in Time Out London. When the band signed to Chris Blackwell's Palm Pictures label a decision was made to re-record the majority of the album (two tracks, including 'Last Good Day of the Year', were not changed). On re-release the album was Album Of The Week in The Guardian in the UK, and  went on to sell more than 230,000 copies internationally.

The band achieved gold-record status in Europe after years of consistent touring and promotion, including tours supporting The Dandy Warhols, David Gray, and Goldfrapp.

In 2002 the second album, Sirena, was released; the version released in the US included a DVD with videos and unreleased live songs. This album sold over 80,000 copies, and contains the singles 'Talking to Myself' and '(Damn These) Hungry Times'. Sirena was met with critical acclaim from the likes of Rolling Stone, USA Today and Billboard, and most notably a 2-page colour feature in The New York Times. In 2005 Sirena was awarded Classic Album status in The Sydney Morning Herald.

The band's line-up changed when songwriter/producer Davey Ray Moor left to pursue production jobs in Italy, such as the No. 4 album Dove Sei Tu for Cristina Dona, a solo album 'Telepathy', released in Europe in the USA (included in Republica's Critics Top 100, 2004) and television soundtracks.

Songwriting duties were taken on by singer Liam McKahey, and after a change in record companies, the group returned in 2005 with the album Nova Scotia, produced by U2's engineer Ger McDonnel. Lead singer Liam McKahey (now resident in Australia) released a solo album in 2009 as 'Liam McKahey and the Bodies' entitled Lonely Road, and 2014 saw the release of a second album entitled 'Black Vinyl Heart'.

The HBO network in the US continues to license Cousteau's earlier work, with their song 'Mesmer' appearing in a feature about Heidi Fleiss, and 'The Last Good Day of The Year' in the HBO film Tell Me You Love Me and again in the 2005 French movie Happily Ever After.

Reboot

In 2016 it was announced that Liam McKahey and Davey Ray Moor were returning as CousteauX and were back in the recording studio preparing new music. To honour the new era the band placed an X at the end of their name. Cousteaux is another popular French family name. The new CousteauX began with a sold-out debut at The Blue Note in Milan in May 2016.  A new album (CousteauX) was released in September 2017 on Silent X Records to international critical acclaim. The duo have performed gigs in London, Portugal and Milan.

The latest album, Stray Gods, was released in August 2021.

Members

Current
Liam McKahey – vocals, percussion
Davey Ray Moor – songwriter, producer, multiple instruments

Former
Robin Brown – guitars
Joe Peet – bass guitar, violin, double bass
Dan Church – drums on the Global Warming Cousteau album
Craig Vear – drums and percussion

Discography

Albums
Cousteau – 1999, Global Warming Ltd (GLOB CD 5)
Cousteau (reissue) – 2000, Palm Pictures Ltd (PALMCD 2058-2)
Sirena – 2002, Palm Pictures Ltd (PALMCD 2083-2)
Nova Scotia – 2005, Endeavur
CousteauX – 2017, Silent X Records
Stray Gods – 2021

Singles (CD)
"The Last Good Day Of The Year" 1999, Global Warming Ltd (WARM CD 6)The Last Good Day Of The Year (radio mix) / Captain Swing / Love In The Meantime / The Last Good Day Of The Year (album mix)
"She Don't Hear Your Prayer" 2000, Palm Pictures Ltd (PPCD 7032-2)She Don't Hear Your Prayer / Lovers In A Loveless Place (Babyman Remix) / Late September Rain
"The Last Good Day Of The Year" 2000, Palm Pictures Ltd (PPCD 7043-2)The Last Good Day Of The Year / Captain Swing / Rachael Lately
"The Last Good Day Of The Year" (US promotional enhanced CD) 2001, Palm Pictures Ltd (PRCD v20581)The Last Good Day Of The Year / Mesmer / You My Lunar Queen / The Last Good Day Of The Year (video)
"Into The Blue EP" (US promotional EP) 2001, Palm Pictures Ltd (PRCD v20583)She Don't Hear Your Prayer (live) / (Shades Of) Ruinous Blue (live) / Jump In The River (live) / Rachael Lately
"Into The Blue EP" (Italian promotional EP) 2001, Nun Entertainment/Tutto magazineHeavy Weather (album version) / The Last Good Day of the Year (remix by Feel Good Production) / The Last Good Day of the Year (live) / She Don't Hear Your Prayer (live) / (Shades Of) Ruinous Blue (live) / Jump In The River (live)
"Wish You Were Her" 2001, Palm Pictures Ltd (PPCD 7049-2)Wish You Were Her / To Know Her / The Cuttlefish Walks The Cuttlefish Waltz
"Talking To Myself" 2002, Palm Pictures Ltd (PPCD 7074-2)Talking To Myself / Short Sighted, Beautiful And Shy / Last Secret Of The Sea
"(Damn These) Hungry Times" 2002, Palm Pictures Ltd (PPCD 7089)(Damn These) Hungry Times (Bedroom Rockers Remix Radio Edit) / (Damn These) Hungry Times (album version) / Nothing So Bad
"Heavy Weather" (Promo) 2002, Naïve / Palm Pictures Ltd (AVI 9012)Heavy Weather
"Sadness" 2005, Endeavor (602498714133)Sadness / Nova Scotia / World Away
"CouseauX" (CD-R & 10" vinyl EP) 2016, Edel / Silent X Records (0211206EIT / SNTX001)Sally Say You Will / Love Is Not On Trial / Eve Of War / When Saturday Comes / Spoiler
"The Innermost Light" (Promo CD-R) 2017, Silent X Records (none)	The Innermost Light (Radio Mix)

Other contributions
WYEP Live and Direct: Volume 4 – On Air Performances (2002) – "Last Good Day of the Year"
KINK LIVE (2002) – "Last Good Day of the Year"
Live @ The World Cafe Tenth Anniversary Edition (2001) – "Last Good Day of the Year"
From the Mountain Music Lounge Volume 9 (2003) – "Last Good Day of the Year"
City Folk Live IV (2001) – "Last Good Day of the Year"
DETLIVE Vol 3 (2002) – "Your Day Will Come"
Sounds Eclectic Too (2002) – "You My Lunar Queen"
Sing a Song for You: Tribute to Tim Buckley (2002) – "Blue Melody"

References

External links

British indie pop groups
English pop music groups
Palm Pictures artists